Ravada is a suburb situated in  Visakhapatnam City, India. The area, which falls within the local administrative limits of Panchayati, is quite close to the Simhadri Super Thermal Power Station site. Ravada is a  well connected with Paravada, and Atchutapuram.

References

Neighbourhoods in Visakhapatnam